

The Gabardini Lictor was a light aircraft developed in Italy in the mid-1930s. It was a low-wing cantilever monoplane with fixed, tailwheel undercarriage and a fully enclosed cabin. Two versions were built, the Lictor 90 with a  Fiat engine, and that Lictor 130 with a  Alfa Romeo 110, a de Havilland Gipsy Major engine built by Alfa Romeo. Development was abandoned in early 1936 when the firm was absorbed by Fiat.

Specifications (Lictor 130)

References
 

Lictor
1930s Italian civil utility aircraft
Low-wing aircraft
Aircraft first flown in 1935